Deforestation in Papua New Guinea has been extensive and in recent decades from 2001 to 2020, Papua New Guinea lost 1.57Mha of tree cover, equivalent to a 3.7% decrease in tree cover since 2000, and 1.15Gt of CO₂e emissions.

Deforestation in Papua New Guinea is mainly a result of illegal logging, which contributed to 70-90% of all timber exports, one of the highest rates in the world. Illegal logging is linked to corruption, environmental issues and human rights concerns.

The PNG Government is interested in turning the asset  into carbon trading revenue through the REDD programme.
April Salome Forest Management Area is a pilot project for REDD initiative  by United Nations Framework Convention on Climate Change.

Deforestation by region
In Papua New Guinea, the top 5 regions were responsible for 53% of all tree cover loss between 2001 and 2020. Western had the most tree cover loss at 205kha compared to an average of 71.4kha
 Western , 205kha
 West New Britain , 179kha
 Madang , 158kha
 East New Britain , 156kha
 Sandaun , 139kha

Legislation, institutions and governance

Legislation
The main legislation governing forestry sector is the Forestry Act 1991, as amended by the Forestry Amendment Act 2019, with additional detail provided in regulations including the Forestry Regulation 1998. Other relevant legislation concerns environmental impact assessment and the collection of royalties.

Institutions
The exportation of timber and the licensing of logging activity in Papua New Guinea is managed by the Papua New Guinea Forestry Authority.

Compliance
International NGOs such as Global Witness have questioned the legality of administration of forest harvesting.

Timber Legality and Timber Verification
The PNG Government has provided little active support for forest or timber certification. In 2012, less than 6% of PNG's forests were independently verified or certified.World Resources Institute, Forest Legality Project, PNG page The Timber Legality and Timber Verification (TLTV) scheme of certification has been partly financed by the International Tropical Timber Organisation (ITTO). A report on forest legality risks for timber sourced from PNG, by NepCon, Consultants to the FSC, an international certification body, gave PNG a rating of 3/100,NEPCon PNG Timber Risk-Assessment 2017  compared to Switzerland with 100/100 and Australia with 98/100.Nepcon Australia Timber Risk Profile

Environment and human rights
PNG's logging industry negatively affects food sources, water supply and the cultural property of communities.

According to Transparency International PNG's logging industry is synonymous with political corruption, police racketeering and the brutal repression of workers, women and those who question its ways.

Land rights 
On 28 May 2010 PNG's Parliament amended the Environment and Conservation Act, removing the rights of indigenous people to challenge deals concerning the
country's natural resources. Reports have also called for governmental and international development partners to reset activities in respect for local communities that actually own the forests enabling the owners to better conserve the forests.

Special Purpose Agricultural and Business Leases (SPABLs)

According to a report published by Greenpeace in 2012, over 5 million hectares of customary land had been improperly leased through Special Purpose Agricultural and Business Leases (SPABLs), between 2003 and 2011. The land equates to over 11% of the country and over 16% of accessible commercial forests. In 2011 forestry exports grew by approximately 20%, almost solely due to logging within SPABLS. There has been a marked increase in deforestation of primary forests particularly for palm oil through SPABLs. Founding father, Kaitlin made her accurate report. According to the report, 75% of the SPABLS are held by foreign owned companies, particularly those based in Malaysia and Australia and almost all logs are being exported to China.

Following an early warning letter from the United Nations High Commission for Human Rights (UNHCHR) expressing concerns over the improper leasing of customary lands, the government of PNG issued a moratorium on the issuance of SPABLs. The government also ordered a Commission of Inquiry (COI) into the improper granting of SPABLs. The findings of the report are expected to be tabled before parliament in August 2012.

Corruption 

The logging industry has influence in PNG through political donations, public sponsorship, lobbying and media ownership.
The 1989 Barnett Inquiry found that some logging companies bribed or influenced politicians. According to the governmental report (1989) corruption included bribery, non-compliance with regulations, extensive violations of landowners’ rights and extreme environmental destruction. Logging companies are roaming the countryside with the self-assurance of robber barons; bribing politicians and leaders, creating social disharmony and ignoring laws in order to gain access to, rip out, and export valuable timber. Logging industry provide a ground for arms smuggling.

There are human rights abuses of the forest communities and labour. A review of fourteen logging operations 2001- 2006 was highly critical, with the exception of a Japanese company. Forest minister, Belden Namah, addressed logging and corruption in the parliament for the first time in 2008. He found that many responsible persons for monitoring forestry operations had ignored the law and were ‘in the pockets’ of logging companies. He suspended two forestry licences and announced that no permits are to be issued for log exports after 2010. Unnamed PNG politicians are linked in the media to US$45 million in a Singapore bank account, allegedly money earned through secret logging deals.

Logging industry
Malaysian timber conglomerate Rimbunan Hijau (RH) is one of the main logging companies. In October 2008 it admitted in court that it had been awarded logging rights in PNG illegally. Operating subsidiary of Rimbunan Hijau include Wawoi Guavi Timbers.

REDD programme
There is no domestic policy or legislation on carbon trading in PNG. The Office for Climate Change and Environmental Sustainability (OCCES) was created in 2008 under the Prime Minister's Office, to manage the REDD funds. In March 2008 PNG signed an agreement with Australia to cooperate on REDD. In 2009 the OCCES issued certificates for at least 40 future REDD credits for 1 million tonnes of carbon each. One of the projects is in the 800,000 hectares (ha) of virgin rainforest in Kamula Duso. The controversies and complexity pose management and governance challenges.

According to IUCN weak forest governance is a factor of forest degradation. If it is unresolved, the success of REDD is uncertain and may reinforce corruption, undermine human rights and threaten forest biodiversity. Friends of the Earth questions: ” Why should complex REDD policies involving large amounts of money work in countries unable to contain illegal logging and forest conversion in the first place?”

See also 
 April Salome Forest Management Area
 Certified wood
 Conservation in Papua New Guinea
 Deforestation in Indonesia
 Reducing emissions from deforestation and forest degradation
 Sustainable forest management

References

External links
Shearman et al.: The State of Forests of Papua New Guinea 2008

Environment of Papua New Guinea
Papua New Guinea
Forestry in Papua New Guinea
Environmental issues in Papua New Guinea